The women's 4 × 100 metre freestyle relay event at the 2006 Commonwealth Games as part of the swimming programme took place on 20 March at the Melbourne Sports and Aquatic Centre in Melbourne, Australia.

Records
Prior to this competition, the existing world and Commonwealth Games records were as follows.

The following records were established during the competition:

Results

References

External links
 Official Melbourne 2006 website

Women's 4 x 100 metre freestyle relay
Commonwealth Games
2006 in women's swimming